Danny Ittiw Kingad  (born September 28, 1995) is a Filipino mixed martial artist, currently competes in the Flyweight division for ONE Championship. As of November 24, 2022, he is ranked #3 in the ONE Flyweight rankings.

Background 
Kingad was born on September 28, 1995 in Sadanga, Mountain Province, Philippines. After losing his father at the age of eight, Kingad began running with the wrong crowd that led him astray. He would drop out of school on multiple occasions and be found sleeping on the streets.

Mixed martial arts career

ONE Championship 
Kingad made his promotional debut against Muhamad Haidar on April 15, 2016, at ONE: Global Rivals. He won the fight via ground and pround technical knockout in the first round.

Kingad faced Eugene Toquero on December 2, 2016, at ONE: Age of Domination. He won the fight via an armbar submission in the first round.

Kingad faced Muhammad Aiman on April 21, 2017, at ONE: Kings of Destiny. He won the fight via unanimous decision.

Kingad faced Adriano Moraes for the ONE Flyweight World Championship on November 10, 2017, at ONE: Legends of the World. He lost the fight via a rear-naked choke submission in the first round.

Kingad was scheduled to face Gianni Subba on March 9, 2018, at ONE: Visions of Victory. However, Subba replacing injured Adriano Moraes against Reece McLaren in the main-event and Kingad faced Sotir Kichukov. He won the fight via unanimous decision.

Kingad faced Ma Hao Bin on June 23, 2018, at ONE: Pinnacle of Power. He won the fight via unanimous decision.

Kingad faced Yuya Wakamatsu on September 22, 2018, at ONE: Conquest of Heroes. He won the fight via unanimous decision.

Kingad faced Tatsumitsu Wada on January 25, 2019, at ONE: Hero's Ascent. He won the fight via unanimous decision.

ONE Flyweight World Grand Prix
In the quarterfinals, Kingad was scheduled to face Andrew Leone on March 31, 2019, at ONE: A New Era. However, Leone withdrew from the bout due to an injured. He was replaced by Senzo Ikeda. He won the fight via unanimous decision.

In the semifinals, Kingad was scheduled to face Kairat Akhmetov on August 2, 2019, at ONE: Dawn of Heroes. However, Akhmetov forced to pull out due to undisclosed injury and was replaced by Reece McLaren. He won the fight via split decision.

In the final, Kingad faced Demetrious Johnson on October 13, 2019, at ONE: Century – Part 1. He lost the fight via unanimous decision.

Post-Grand Prix reign
Kingad faced Xie Wei on January 31, 2020, at ONE: Fire & Fury.  He won the fight via unanimous decision.

Kingad was scheduled to face Kairat Akhmetov on December 4, 2020, at ONE: Big Bang. However, Kingad forced to withdraw due to cornermen tested positive for COVID-19. The pair was rescheduled on December 3, 2021 and aired on December 17, 2021, at ONE: Winter Warriors II. He lost the fight via unanimous decision.

Kingad was scheduled to face Gurdarshan Mangat on December 3, 2022, at ONE 164. However, Mangat withdrew due to undisclosed injury and the bout was scrapped.

Kingad faced Eko Roni Saputra on February 25, 2023, at ONE Fight Night 7. He won the fight via unanimous decision.

Championships and accomplishments 
ONE Championship
ONE Flyweight World Grand Prix Tournament Runner-up

Mixed martial arts record 

|-
|Win
|align=center| 15–3
|Eko Roni Saputra
|Decision (unanimous)
|ONE Fight Night 7
|
|align=center| 3
|align=center| 5:00
|Bangkok, Thailand 
|
|-
|Loss
|align=center| 14–3
|Kairat Akhmetov
|Decision (unanimous)
|ONE: Winter Warriors II
|
|align=center| 3
|align=center| 5:00
|Kallang, Singapore 
|
|-
|Win
|align=center| 14–2
|Xie Wei
|Decision (unanimous)
|ONE: Fire & Fury
|
|align=center| 3
|align=center| 5:00
|Pasay, Philippines 
|
|-
|Loss
|align=center| 13–2
|Demetrious Johnson
|Decision (unanimous)
|ONE: Century – Part 1
|
|align=center| 3
|align=center| 5:00
|Tokyo, Japan
|
|-
|Win
|align=center| 13–1
|Reece McLaren 
|Decision (split)
|ONE: Dawn of Heroes
|
|align=center| 3
|align=center| 5:00
|Pasay, Philippines 
|
|-
|Win
|align=center| 12–1
|Senzo Ikeda
|Decision (unanimous)
|ONE: A New Era
|
|align=center| 3
|align=center| 5:00
|Tokyo, Japan
|
|-
|Win
|align=center| 11–1
|Tatsumitsu Wada
|Decision (unanimous)
|ONE: Hero's Ascent
|
|align=center| 3
|align=center| 5:00
|Pasay, Philippines 
|
|-
|Win
|align=center| 10–1
|Yuya Wakamatsu 
|Decision (unanimous)
|ONE: Conquest of Heroes
|
|align=center| 3
|align=center| 5:00
|Jakarta, Indonesia 
|
|-
|Win
|align=center| 9–1
|Ma Hao Bin
|Decision (unanimous)
|ONE: Pinnacle of Power
|
|align=center| 3
|align=center| 5:00
|Beijing, China
|
|-
|Win
|align=center| 8–1
|Sotir Kichukov
|Decision (unanimous)
|ONE: Visions of Victory
|
|align=center| 3
|align=center| 5:00
|Kuala Lumpur, Malaysia
|
|-
|Loss
|align=center| 7–1
|Adriano Moraes
|Submission (rear-naked choke)
|ONE: Legends of the World
|
|align=center| 1
|align=center| 4:45
|Pasay, Philippines 
|
|-
|Win
|align=center| 7–0
|Muhammad Aiman
|Decision (unanimous)
|ONE: Kings of Destiny
|
|align=center| 3
|align=center| 5:00
|Pasay, Philippines 
|
|-
|Win
|align=center| 6–0
|Eugene Toquero
|Submission (armbar)
|ONE: Age of Domination
|
|align=center| 1
|align=center| 4:36
|Pasay, Philippines 
|
|-
|Win
|align=center| 5–0
|Muhamad Haidar
|TKO (punches)
|ONE: Global Rivals
|
|align=center| 1
|align=center| 2:20
|Pasay, Philippines 
|
|-
|Win
|align=center| 4–0
|Raymond Doliguez 
|Decision (unanimous)
|PXC Laban: Baguio 4
|
|align=center| 3
|align=center| 5:00
|Baguio, Philippines 
|
|-
|Win
|align=center| 3–0
|Robin Catalan 
|Submission (armbar)
|PXC Laban: Baguio 3
|
|align=center| 2
|align=center| 4:21
|Baguio, Philippines 
|
|-
|Win
|align=center| 2–0
|Jiar Castillo
|Decision (unanimous)
|Spartacus Combat MMA: Fight Night
|
|align=center| 3
|align=center| 5:00
|Manila, Philippines 
|
|-
|Win
|align=center| 1–0
|Reymond Doliguez
|Decision (unanimous)
|Rock N' Rumble Year 2
|
|align=center| 3
|align=center| 5:00
|Quezon City, Philippines 
|

See also
 List of current ONE fighters

References

External links
 Danny Kingad at ONE Championship
 

1995 births
Living people
Filipino male mixed martial artists
Filipino sanshou practitioners
Filipino Muay Thai practitioners
Mixed martial artists utilizing sanshou
Mixed martial artists utilizing Muay Thai
Flyweight mixed martial artists
Bantamweight mixed martial artists